Cheryl Chase may refer to:

 Cheryl Chase (activist) (born 1956), American activist
 Cheryl Chase (actress) (born 1958), American actress
 Cheryl Chase (politician) (born 1953), American politician